Cincalok is a Malay dish that originated in Malacca, Malaysia, consumed by Malay, Peranakan and Kristang. It can trace its origin during Portuguese occupation of Malacca. In Malacca, the shrimp is called udang geragau. This dish made up of fermented small shrimps or krill. It is usually served as a condiment together with chillis, shallots and lime juice. The shrimp in the pinkish coloured cincalok are readily identifiable and the taste is salty.  Sir R. O. Winstedt has written about "Cencaluk" in Malaysia in his book "The Circumstances of Malay Life - 1909".  This shrimp is available in particular season in Pantai Klebang, Limbongan, Tanjung Kling and several coastal areas. 

Nowadays, cencaluk making enterprises are gaining ground among the residents in several areas in the state of Melaka. The state government itself has designated the State Legislative Assembly constituency Sungai Udang as the area to produce cencaluk in the 'Satu DUN Satu Produk' plan.
  
Apart from that, cencaluk is also now easily available through open sales such as by the roadside and in the markets around the state. For those who pass the shores of Tanjung Kling to Sungai Udang, you will definitely be able to see a row of stalls selling cencaluk and belacan.

The consumption of cincalok has also spread to Riau and West Kalimantan in Indonesia. It is similar to bagoong alamang (see shrimp paste) in the Philippines and khoei chalu in Thailand.

Cincalok manufacturing
The process of making cincalok requires several steps. Fresh small prawns (udang geragau) are added with salt and rice in equal proportions. After the ingredients are thoroughly mixed, it will be sealed in a jar and allowed to ferment for three days. There are also cincalok-makers who increase the proportion of rice in the mixture believing it to enhance the taste of the finished product.

As the finished product is fermented in a glass container, the fermentation process causes pressure to build up inside the container. Hence, care must be taken when opening the pressurized container containing ready-made cincalok.

See also

 List of fish sauces
 List of Indonesian condiments
 Malay cuisine
 Peranakan cuisine
 Saeu-jeot

References

 Gateway to Peranakan Food Culture Gek Suan Tan, Tan Gek Suan, Wing Fee. Asiapac Books Pte Ltd. 

Indonesian condiments
Malaysian condiments
Malay cuisine
Peranakan cuisine
Fish sauces